Rangitīaria Dennan  (née Ratema; 14 July 1897 – 13 August 1970), known as Guide Rangi, was a New Zealand tribal leader, teacher and tourist guide. Of Māori descent, she identified with the Ngāti Pikiao, Ngāti Tarāwhai, Te Arawa and Tūhourangi iwi. A granddaughter of Tene Waitere, she was born in Ngāpuna, near Rotorua, New Zealand. She attended Hukarere Native School for Girls.

In the 1957 New Year Honours she was appointed a Member of the Order of the British Empire for services to the tourist movement. In 1949 she was appointed a Serving Sister of the Order of St John for her services to St John.

References

1897 births
1970 deaths
New Zealand schoolteachers
Ngāti Pikiao people
Te Arawa people
Tuhourangi people
New Zealand Māori schoolteachers
New Zealand Members of the Order of the British Empire
People educated at Hukarere Girls' College
Tour guides